The 2014 Baylor Bears baseball team represents Baylor University in the 2014 college baseball season. Baylor competes in Division I of the National Collegiate Athletic Association (NCAA) as a charter member of the Big 12 Conference. The Bears play home games at Baylor Ballpark on the university's campus in Waco, Texas. Twenty year head coach Steve Smith leads the Bears, a former pitcher for the team during the 1982 and 1983 seasons.

Personnel

Coaches

Players

Schedule

Ranking movements

References

External links
 Official website 

Baylor Bears baseball seasons
Baylor
Baylor